Nanthi Kadal is a lagoon in Mullaitivu District, north-east Sri Lanka. The English translation of Nanthi Kadal is "the sea of conches".

The lagoon is fed by a number of small rivers, including Per Aru.

The town of Mullaitivu is located on land sandwiched between Nanthi Kadal and the Indian Ocean. As such Nanthi Kadal is sometimes referred to as Mullaitivu lagoon.

This is the place where the Sri Lankan Government claims to have killed the LTTE Chief Vellupillai Prabhakaran.

References

Bodies of water of Mullaitivu District
Lagoons of Sri Lanka